Capão Bonito is a municipality in the state of São Paulo in Brazil. The population is 47,118 (2020 est.) in an area of 1640 km². The elevation is 705 m.

The municipality contains part of the  Carlos Botelho State Park, created in 1982.
It contains part of the  Serra do Mar Environmental Protection Area, created in 1984.
It also contains the  Nascentes do Paranapanema State Park, created in 2012.

References